Elwood is a census-designated place (CDP) in the Town of Huntington in Suffolk County, on Long Island, in New York, United States. The population was 11,177 at the 2010 census.

The hamlet, given its location in the center of the Town of Huntington, is referred to as "The Heart Of Huntington."

Geography

Demographics

As of the census of 2000, there were 10,916 people, 3,435 households, and 2,985 families residing in the CDP. The population density was 2,262.3 per square mile (872.6/km2). There were 3,493 housing units at an average density of 723.9/sq mi (279.2/km2). The racial makeup of the CDP was 86.02% White, 5.61% African American, 0.22% Native American, 5.60% Asian, 0.03% Pacific Islander, 1.36% from other races, and 1.17% from two or more races. Hispanic or Latino of any race were 5.04% of the population.

There were 3,435 households, out of which 39.4% had children under the age of 18 living with them, 74.9% were married couples living together, 9.0% had a female householder with no husband present, and 13.1% were non-families. 10.1% of all households were made up of individuals, and 4.9% had someone living alone who was 65 years of age or older. The average household size was 3.15 and the average family size was 3.36. 

In the CDP, the population was spread out, with 26.1% under the age of 18, 5.8% from 18 to 24, 30.6% from 25 to 44, 24.5% from 45 to 64, and 13.0% who were 65 years of age or older. The median age was 38 years. For every 100 females, there were 95.5 males. For every 100 females age 18 and over, there were 93.2 males.

The median income for a household in the CDP was $89,424, and the median income for a family was $94,404. Males had a median income of $63,534 versus $41,341 for females. The per capita income for the CDP was $32,655. About 1.2% of families and 2.1% of the population were below the poverty line, including 2.3% of those under age 18 and 2.3% of those age 65 or over.

As of the 2010 census, the demographics have changed slightly. They are now 82.12% White, 6.24% Black or African American, 7.96% Asian, 1.95% Some Other Race, and 1.58% Two or More Races. Native Americans made up 0.11% of the population, with 0.04 of the population being Native Hawaiian or Pacific Islander.

People who were Hispanic or Latino of any race made up 8.21% of the population.

Education 
The hamlet is primarily located within the boundaries of (and is thus served by) the Elwood Union Free School District. However, a small section of the hamlet's southwestern extreme is located within the boundaries of (and is thus served by) the South Huntington Union Free School District. As such, children who reside within the hamlet and attend public schools go to school in one of these two districts, depending on where they reside within the hamlet.

Transportation 
Major roads in Elwood include Jericho Turnpike (New York State Route 25), Burr Road, Clay Pitts Road, Cuba Hill Road, Daly Road, Elwood Road, Little Plains Road, and Park Avenue.

Notable person 
 Anthony Cumia (born 1961) – Radio show host.

References

Huntington, New York
Census-designated places in New York (state)
Hamlets in New York (state)
Census-designated places in Suffolk County, New York
Hamlets in Suffolk County, New York